Turunçlu is a small village in Yenişehir district, which is an intracity district within Greater Mersin, Turkey. The population of the village is 170 as of 2012.

References

Villages in Yenişehir, Mersin